Smaïl Khabatou (8 September 1920 – 15 September 2014) was an Algerian football player and manager.

Playing career
Khabatou played club football for Stade Algérien de Belcourt, MC Alger and USM Blida.

Coaching career
Khabatou was player-manager of MC Alger and USM Blida, and also managed OM Ruisseau and WA Boufarik, as well as the Algerian national team.

References

1920 births
2014 deaths
Footballers from Algiers
Algerian footballers
MC Alger players
USM Blida players
Algerian football managers
MC Alger managers
USM Blida managers
Algeria national football team managers
Association footballers not categorized by position
WA Boufarik managers
21st-century Algerian people